The 2016 Fukuoka International Women's Cup was a professional tennis tournament played on outdoor grass courts. It was the sixteenth edition of the tournament and part of the 2016 ITF Women's Circuit, offering a total of $50,000 in prize money. It took place in Fukuoka, Japan, on 9–15 May 2016.

Singles main draw entrants

Seeds 

 1 Rankings as of 2 May 2016.

Other entrants 
The following players received wildcards into the singles main draw:
  Rika Fujiwara
  Haine Ogata
  Lisa-Marie Rioux
  Kimika Sakata

The following players received entry from the qualifying draw:
  Shiho Akita
  Mana Ayukawa
  Lizette Cabrera
  Lee Pei-chi

The following player received entry by a protected ranking:
  Miharu Imanishi

Champions

Singles

 Ksenia Lykina def.  Kyōka Okamura, 6–2, 6–7(2–7), 6–0

Doubles

 Indy de Vroome /  Aleksandrina Naydenova def.  Nigina Abduraimova /  Ksenia Lykina, 6–4, 6–1

External links 
 2016 Fukuoka International Women's Cup at ITFtennis.com
 Official website 

2016 ITF Women's Circuit
2016 in Japanese women's sport
2016
2016 in Japanese tennis